is a manga series by Masaya Hokazono about a boy who finds an inugami, a dog god of the Japanese mythology.

Story
A dog that can scarcely remember his past, Inugami only knows that he has been ordered to spy on humans. Hosting a distinctive "23" tattooed on his ear, he has the ability to not only quickly recover from injuries but to also grow spikes on his back. His abilities include, but are not limited to, passing on his power to anyone who happens to touch his blood. Unfortunately, his unusual power also attracts the attention of those interested in acquiring his power.

Having wandered into the city, Inugami finds himself in an abandoned building which Fumiki, an aspiring poet, frequents. After listening to Fumiki's poetry for some time, Inugami befriends the aspiring poet and eventually learns to speak, much to Fumiki's surprise. Through their friendship, Inugami realizes that not all humans are bad. Unfortunately a pharmaceutical corporation soon learns of Inugami's existence. Realizing that Inugami's regenerating cells could lead to immortality, the corporation attempts and succeeds at acquiring Inugami's gene's. Soon, the company ends up creating terrifying monsters. Soon, Inugami ends up in a fight with one of these monsters and for a moment, questions the goodness of humans, who have created these monsters. In that fleeting moment of doubt, a different Inugami, with the intent to kill humans, appears.

Characters
23
One of the main characters and an inugami that befriends Fumiki.

Fumiki
One of the main characters

Mika
Mika is the childhood friend of fumiki

Kiryu
The main antagonist of the series.

External links

Kodansha manga
Seinen manga